Rebecca "Becky" Southworth is a British journalist and television presenter.

She has authored several documentary films for the BBC as well as working as a producer on a number of other programmes and channels such as ITV 2, BBC 2 and BBC iplayer.

In 2017, Becky won a Royal Television Society award for her debut documentary ‘Kicked Out: From Care To Chaos’.

Her second documentary 'Can Sex Offenders Change?' was released in 2020. It was well received, and was shortlisted for a 2021 Grierson Award.

Recently Becky has Narrated BBCThree Series 3 “Tagged: Women on Tag” 2021 which follows young women on Tag and the struggles they face. She has then gone on to narrate the latest 4th series “Tagged: We’re Watching You” in 2023

In January 2022 Becky was named as one of BIG ISSUE’S 100 change makers 2022 ranking 12 in a lineup of inspirational people and charities as a tribute to the documentaries she has made tackling societal issues.

In August 2022 Becky narrated Channel 5’s HMP Styal: Women behind bars 

From 2023 Becky starting reporting on Sunday Morning Live  as well as producing and narrating The Mormons Are Coming for BBC2

References

External links 
 

Year of birth missing (living people)
Living people
British journalists
British filmmakers